The fourth season of the American television drama series Homeland premiered on October 5, 2014, and concluded on December 21, 2014, on Showtime, consisting of 12 episodes. The series started as a loosely based variation of the two-season run of the Israeli television series Hatufim (English: Prisoners of War) created by Gideon Raff and is developed for American television by Howard Gordon and Alex Gansa. The fourth season was released on Blu-ray and DVD on September 8, 2015, and became available for streaming on Hulu on August 1, 2016.

Cast and characters

Main

 Claire Danes as Carrie Mathison, a CIA intelligence officer assigned to the Counterterrorism Center
 Rupert Friend as Peter Quinn, a CIA SAD/SOG (black ops) operative
 Nazanin Boniadi as Fara Sherazi, an intelligent, young, and professional Persian analyst
 Laila Robins as Martha Boyd, the United States ambassador to the Islamic Republic of Pakistan
 Tracy Letts as Andrew Lockhart, the new director of the CIA
 Mandy Patinkin as Saul Berenson, Carrie's old boss and mentor, now working in the private sector

Recurring
 Suraj Sharma as Aayan Ibrahim, a Pakistani medical student
 Amy Hargreaves as Maggie Mathison, Carrie's sister and a psychiatrist
 Sarita Choudhury as Mira Berenson, Saul's wife
 Alex Lanipekun as Hank Wonham, a CIA officer at the Kabul station
 Akshay Kumar as Rahim, a Pakistani medical student
 Shavani Seth as Kiran, Aayan's girlfriend and fellow medical student
 F. Murray Abraham as Dar Adal, a retired black ops specialist
 Michael O'Keefe as John Redmond, a CIA deputy station chief in Pakistan
 Maury Sterling as Max Piotrowski, a freelance surveillance expert
 Mark Moses as Dennis Boyd, Martha's husband and a political science teacher at Islamabad's Quaid-I-Azam University
 Raza Jaffrey as Aasar Khan, the counter-terrorism chief of Pakistan's ISI
 Nimrat Kaur as Tasneem Qureishi, a member of Pakistan's Inter-Services Intelligence
 Art Malik as Bunran "Bunny" Latif, a retired Pakistani general
 Numan Acar as Haissam Haqqani, a high-priority target and Taliban leader

Special guest
 Damian Lewis as Nicholas Brody, who appears in a hallucination of Carrie's.

Guest

 Patrick St. Esprit as Aaron Gage
 Corey Stoll as Sandy Bachman, the CIA station chief in Pakistan
 Adam Godley as Jordan Harris, a CIA case officer
 Emily Walker as The Landlady, with whom Quinn has a brief relationship
 Nina Hoss as Astrid, Quinn's former lover who works for the German embassy
 Victoria Clark as Ellen Mathison, Carrie's mother
 John Getz as Joe Crocker

Episodes

Production
On October 22, 2013, Homeland was renewed for a fourth season, consisting of 12 episodes. Production and filming for the fourth season began in June 2014, shifting production to Cape Town, South Africa. Executive producers for the fourth season are Alex Gansa, Howard Gordon, Gideon Raff, Alexander Cary, Chip Johannessen, Meredith Stiehm, Avi Nir, and Ran Telem.

Casting
Nazanin Boniadi, who had a recurring role in the third season as Fara Sherazi, was promoted to series regular for the fourth season. Several actors were cast for the fourth season in June 2014, including new series regular Laila Robins, as well as Corey Stoll, Suraj Sharma, Raza Jaffrey, and Michael O'Keefe, who all have recurring roles. In July 2014, Nimrat Kaur, Mark Moses and Art Malik were additionally cast in recurring roles.

Reception

Critical response
The fourth season received positive reviews from critics, with particular acclaim for the second half. On Metacritic, it has a score of 74 out of 100, based on 22 reviews. On Rotten Tomatoes, the season received an 82% rating based on 49 reviews with an average rating of 8.0/10. The critical consensus reads "Homeland is back on top, with a renewed energy and focus not seen since its first season." Verne Gay of Newsday gave the season premiere an "A+" grade and wrote that the show "feels as fresh, important and relevant as yesterday's news – or tomorrow's news. A bracing, intelligent start." Matthew Gilbert of The Boston Globe noted it has improved over its previous seasons, and wrote, "The rebooted Homeland promises to be an engaging, streamlined CIA thriller with a few big ideas about America and the war on terrorism." Mary McNamara of the Los Angeles Times also noted the series improvement and wrote, "Early episodes are strong, if not as shattering as the inaugural season." The season finale was well-received, with Rotten Tomatoes giving the episode a 100% rating based on 12 critic reviews, saying "Subverting expectations, "Long Time Coming" makes for a smart, sharp, and satisfyingly subdued finale for an excellent season of Homeland."

Accolades
For the 21st Screen Actors Guild Awards, the cast was nominated for Best Drama Ensemble, Claire Danes was nominated for Best Drama Actress, and the series was nominated for Best Stunt Team. For the 72nd Golden Globe Awards, Danes was nominated for Best Actress – Television Series Drama. For the 67th Directors Guild of America Awards, Lesli Linka Glatter won for Outstanding Directing – Drama Series for the episode "From A to B and Back Again", and Dan Attias received a nomination in the same category for directing "13 Hours in Islamabad". For the 5th Critics' Choice Television Awards, the series was nominated for Best Drama Series and Mandy Patinkin was nominated for Best Supporting Actor in a Drama Series.

For the 67th Primetime Emmy Awards, the series received five nominations, including Outstanding Drama Series, Claire Danes for Outstanding Lead Actress in a Drama Series, F. Murray Abraham for Outstanding Guest Actor in a Drama Series, and Lesli Linka Glatter for Outstanding Directing for a Drama Series for "From A to B and Back Again".

Criticisms
Laura Durkay of The Washington Post criticized the show for perpetuating cultural stereotypes and Islamophobia.

According to media reports, Pakistani officials were unhappy over the depiction of Pakistan in the fourth season. Nadeem Hotiana, spokesperson of Pakistan Embassy, said, "Maligning a country that has been a close partner and ally of the US is a disservice not only to the security interests of the US, but also to the people of the US." A source was quoted as saying, "Islamabad is a quiet, picturesque city with beautiful mountains and lush greenery. In Homeland, it’s portrayed as a grimy hellhole and war zone where shootouts and bombs go off with dead bodies scattered around. Nothing is further from the truth." The alleged Islamabad scenes were filmed in Cape Town, South Africa. The officials also lashed out at "absurd" portrayal of terrorist treatment in Pakistan, saying, "Repeated insinuations that an intelligence agency of Pakistan is complicit in protecting the terrorists at the expense of innocent Pakistani civilians is not only absurd but also an insult to the ultimate sacrifices of the thousands of Pakistani security personnel in the war against terrorism."

References

External links
 
 

4
2014 American television seasons
Television episodes set in Afghanistan
Television shows filmed in South Africa